The Veli-Pekka Ketola trophy is a Finnish ice hockey trophy awarded by the Liiga to the player who scores the most points during regular season play. It was first awarded to Henry Saleva of Kärpät in the 1977–78 SM-liiga season. The trophy was renamed in honour of Veli-Pekka Ketola in 1995.

The trophy has overwhelmingly been won by Finns, foreign players have won the award just eight times since 1978. Matti Hagman holds the record for most titles, with four. To date, Canadians Steve Kariya and Martin Kariya are the only two brothers to win the title.

Winners 

* Liiga single-season point record
 Sources:

References
Content in this article is translated from the existing Finnish Wikipedia article at :fi:Veli-Pekka Ketola -palkinto; see its history for attribution.

Liiga trophies and awards